The AEC Renown was a front-engined low-height double-decker bus chassis manufactured by AEC. It superseded the AEC Bridgemaster around 1962.

History
The low-height double-decker AEC Bridgemaster was nearing the end of its production when AEC launched the Renown as its successor around 1962, not long before the acquisition of AEC by Leyland. The main difference between the Renown and its predecessor was the chassis design, the Renown was designed as a complete chassis, rather than integral construction adopted by the Bridgemaster, thus the Renown could be suited to different body designs.

The design, like the Bristol Lodekka and the Dennis Loline meant this double-decker could travel under low height bridges, whilst maintaining near-full-height standing room.

After Leyland acquired a 25% stake of Bristol Commercial Vehicles and Eastern Coach Works in late 1965, Leyland had three different front-engined low-height double-deck designs: AEC Renown, Bristol Lodekka and Albion Lowlander. Leyland quickly decided to cease taking orders for the Renown and Lowlander. The last AEC Renown was delivered in 1967, with a total of 251 buses built.

References

 

Renown
Double-decker buses
Vehicles introduced in 1962
Half-cab buses